Bone morphogenetic protein 8B is a protein that in humans is encoded by the BMP8B gene.

The protein encoded by this gene is a member of the TGF-β superfamily. It has close sequence homology to BMP7 and BMP5 and is believed to play a role in bone and cartilage development. It has been shown to be expressed in the hippocampus of murine embryos.

The bone morphogenetic proteins (BMPs) are a family of secreted signaling molecules that can induce ectopic bone growth. Many BMPs are part of the transforming growth factor-beta (TGFB) superfamily. BMPs were originally identified by an ability of demineralized bone extract to induce endochondral osteogenesis in vivo in an extraskeletal site. Based on its expression early in embryogenesis, the BMP encoded by this gene has a proposed role in early development. In addition, the fact that this BMP is closely related to BMP5 and BMP7 has led to speculation of possible bone inductive activity.

References

Further reading

External links
 

Bone morphogenetic protein
Developmental genes and proteins
TGFβ domain